James Williams Adams VC (24 November 1839 – 20 October 1903) was an Irish Anglican chaplain and a recipient of the Victoria Cross, the highest award for gallantry in the face of the enemy that can be awarded to British and Commonwealth forces. He was the first clergyman, and the last of five civilians, to be awarded the VC.

Early life
Adams was born in Cork, Ireland on 24 November 1839. He was the only son of James O'Brien Adams, magistrate, and his wife, Elizabeth Williams.

He was educated at Hamblin and Porter's Grammar School, Cork and Trinity College, Dublin and ordained in 1863.
His first curacy was in Hyde, Hampshire, from 1863 to 1865 and then at Shottesbrooke, Berkshire, from 1865 to 1866. In October 1866 Adams became a chaplain on the Bengal establishment under Bishop Robert Milman at Calcutta.

Victoria Cross
Reverend James Williams Adams was 40 years old, and a chaplain in the Bengal Ecclesiastical Department (serving as chaplain to the Kabul Field Force), British Indian Army during the Second Afghan War when on 11 December 1879 he carried out the actions for which he was awarded the VC.  The citation was published in a supplement to the London Gazette of 24 August 1881 (dated 26 August 1881) and read:

For the above actions Adams was recommended for the VC by Lord Roberts. Along with the Presbyterian and Roman Catholic chaplains who also accompanied the force, Adams was three times mentioned in dispatches during the campaign. He received his medal from Queen Victoria at Buckingham Palace on 1 December 1881.

Later career and life
In 1885 he accompanied the field force under Lord Roberts in Burma, and he took part in the operations there.

Returning to England he was the rector of Postwick (1887–94) and vicar of Stow Bardolph (1895–1902) in Norfolk. In 1902 he was instituted rector of Ashwell, Rutland.

Adams was appointed an honorary chaplain to the Prince of Wales on 7 May 1900, and following the Prince's accession as King Edward VII he was confirmed in the post of honorary chaplain to the King on 23 July 1901. After the resignation of Reverend Handley Moule to become bishop in September 1901, Adams was appointed one of twelve chaplains-in-ordinary to the King.

Adams died on 20 October 1903 and was buried on 24 October in the churchyard of St Mary's Church, Ashwell, Rutland where he was rector. His grave was restored in 2007.

On 16 August 1881 at Iver Heath, he married Alice Mary, eldest daughter of Sir Thomas Willshire, 1st Baronet; they had a daughter, Edith, who married Geoffry Northcote.

See also
Siege of the Sherpur Cantonment

References

External links
Burial location of James Adams (Rutland)
Grave details

Military personnel from County Cork
Irish recipients of the Victoria Cross
People from Cork (city)
Irish military chaplains
19th-century Irish Anglican priests
1839 births
1903 deaths
Irish soldiers in the British Indian Army
Second Anglo-Afghan War recipients of the Victoria Cross
20th-century Irish Anglican priests
Honorary Chaplains to the King
Second Anglo-Afghan War chaplains
British Indian Army chaplains
Alumni of Trinity College Dublin
People from Stow Bardolph
People from Ashwell, Rutland
Burials in Rutland
People from Broadland (district)